Cobaea is a genus of flowering plants including about 20 species of rapid growing, ornamental climbers whose native range extends from Mexico to Peru. The botanical name honors Father Bernabé Cobo, Spanish Jesuit of the seventeenth century, naturalist, and resident of America for many years. The woody stems can reach . Leaves are alternate lobed with opposite pairs and tendrils. In late summer to early spring, the large, bell-shaped flowers are borne profusely and singly along the stems with bright green, violet, or purple in colors. The plants can become invasive in some areas, and are common weeds in New Zealand.

Species
The Plant List (version 1.1, September 2013) accepts the following species:
Cobaea aequatoriensis Aspl.
Cobaea aschersoniana Brand
Cobaea biaurita Standl.
Cobaea campanulata Hemsl.
Cobaea flava Prather
Cobaea gracilis (Oerst.) Hemsl.
Cobaea lutea D.Don
Cobaea minor M.Martens & Galeotti
Cobaea pachysepala Standl.
Cobaea paneroi Prather
Cobaea penduliflora (H.Karst.) Hook.f.
Cobaea pringlei (House) Standl.
Cobaea rotundiflora Prather
Cobaea scandens Cav. – cathedral bells, cup and saucer vine
Cobaea skutchii I.M.Johnst.
Cobaea stipularis Benth.
Cobaea trianae Hemsl.
Cobaea triflora Donn.Sm.

References

Lord, Tony (2003) Flora : The Gardener's Bible : More than 20,000 garden plants from around the world. London: Cassell.  
Ellison, Don (1999) Cultivated Plants of the World. London: New Holland (1st ed.: Brisbane: Flora Publications International, 1995) 
Botanica Sistematica

Polemoniaceae
Polemoniaceae genera
Vines
Taxa named by Antonio José Cavanilles